Dror Paley (born March 25, 1956) is a Canadian-trained orthopedic surgeon, who specializes in limb lengthening and deformity correction procedures.

Education 
Dr. Paley trained in surgery at the Johns Hopkins Hospital and in orthopedic surgery at the University of Toronto Medical School. He moved to Baltimore to join the University of Maryland in 1987. From 1987 to 2001, Paley worked at the University of Maryland as professor of Orthopedics and chief of Pediatric Orthopedics.

Career 
Paley has been licensed with the Province of Ontario, Canada since 1980, the Maryland Board of Physicians since 1986, and with the Florida department of Health since 2009.

In 1991, Paley co-founded the Maryland Center for Limb Lengthening and Reconstruction at James Lawrence Kernan Hospital with Dr. John Herzenberg.  In 2001, they formed the International Center for Limb Lengthening at Sinai Hospital. He authored a book, Principles of Deformity Correction in 2002, that was edited by Herzenberg.

Paley was among the first orthopedic surgeons to use the PRECICE intramedullary nail for cosmetic leg lengthening, as well as its second version (PRECICE 2).

In 2013, Smith & Nephew released a new Modular Rail System for external fixation and limb deformity correction, in collaboration with Paley.

As of 2014 Paley had developed around 100 surgical procedures to reconstruct limbs.

Limb lengthening training
Paley specializes in limb-Lengthening and limb-corrective surgeries (usually in the legs). According to his biography he has "performed more than 20,000 limb lengthening and reconstruction-related procedures"  He was trained in Limb Lengthening by Gavriil Ilizarov who created the "Ilizarov method" of limb reconstruction more technically known as Distraction osteogenesis, where bone is separated from itself using an Ilizarov apparatus and regrows into the created gap over time. Paley is credited with bringing the Ilizarov method to the west and claims to have performed the first recorded Western attempt of it in April 1987.

Books

Personal life 
Paley lives in West Palm Beach. He is fluent in six languages and practices cycling, skiing and rock climbing.

References

External links
Paley Institute

Canadian orthopedic surgeons
1956 births
Living people